Joseph Coope-Franklin is a Welsh professional rugby league player. 

In September 2022 Coope-Franklin made his Salford debut in the Super League against the Warrington Wolves.

References

External links
Salford Red Devils profile

2001 births
Living people
Preston Grasshoppers R.F.C. players
Rugby league centres
Rugby league players from Caerphilly
Rugby union centres
Rugby union players from Caerphilly
Salford Red Devils players
Welsh rugby league players
Welsh rugby union players